The California Symphony is a professional orchestra based in Walnut Creek, California, in the East Bay region of the San Francisco Bay Area. The orchestra, which "may be the most forward-looking music organization around", performs in the Lesher Center for the Arts in Walnut Creek and is a member of the Association of California Symphony Orchestras. It has been credited with "redefining the classical concert experience as we know it."

History

1986–2013: Founding  

The orchestra was founded in 1986 by Barry Jekowsky, the principal timpanist for the San Francisco Symphony and a Juilliard-trained conductor who had recently made his international debut as the guest conductor of the London Philharmonic Orchestra. The first performance was May 17, 1987, where the orchestra performed three pieces with guest artist Kyoko Takezawa on violin. The first full concert season for the symphony began the next year.

In 1997, the orchestra made its recording debut on the CD, Lou Harrison: A Portrait, conducted by Barry Jekowsky, and featuring the music of California composer Lou Harrison, with Grammy Award-winning vocalist Al Jarreau as the soloist in Harrison's Symphony No. 4.

Executive Director Stacey Street was hired in 2001, replacing Millie Mitchell. According to Jekowsky, "She will bring such a breath of fresh air to what we’re doing, and I think that we’ll do the same for her." By 2002, Street had negotiated a 3-year contract with musicians and grew an operating surplus of $37,500.

At the end of 2009, Executive Director Stacey Street left the California Symphony.

In October 2010, after 24 years with the California Symphony, Jekowsky left the orchestra and the search for a new music director began.

Seasons of guest conductors 

Asher Raboy was the first guest conductor to lead the orchestra. In particular, the guest conductors "garnered the symphony some of the best reviews and most enthusiastic audiences of its quarter-century history."

After the success of the 2011–2012 season, the symphony added 3 concerts to the next year's program to bring the grand total to 7. Over the course of the 2012–2013 season, the California Symphony auditioned 7 conductors for the position of music director, each conductor leading the ensemble in one of the season's concerts. The search for conductors was led by Board President Thomas Overhoff. The search also included member Chuck Scanlan, and Board Chair Richard Jarrett.

2013–2017

Music Director Donato Cabrera 
After multiple appearances as a guest conductor for the California Symphony and succeeding in the audition process, Donato Cabrera was appointed the position of Music Director in 2013. When Donato Cabrera was chosen to become the next music director, member Chuck Scanlan said about the conductor, "He had ideas, plans, programs, [and] he was the most focused on the future." According to the California Symphony website, "Since Cabrera’s appointment as Music Director of the California Symphony in 2013, the organization has reached new artistic heights by implementing innovative programming that emphasizes welcoming newcomers and loyalists alike, building on its reputation for championing music by living composers, and committing to programming music by women and people of color."

Executive Director Aubrey Bergauer 
In October 2014, Aubrey Bergauer took the position of executive director. The orchestra, which had been contemplating closure before Bergauer came aboard, has experienced a remarkable turn of fortunes during her five-year tenure. She, along with partners Music Director Donato Cabrera and Symphony Board President Bill Armstrong, has been credited with "saving the orchestra" from near-imminent financial collapse in 2014.

Bergauer restructured the California Symphony's marketing and development campaigns as well as revolutionizing the concert setting. In addition, she focused on engaging younger and more diverse audiences using data-driven research gained from the "Orchestra X" project. By 2019, the California Symphony had doubled their audience, increased the number of donor households by 180%, more than doubled the number of performances offered per year, increased budget by 50%, and secured the largest endowment gift in the orchestra's history, at $1 million.

2017–present 

The current concertmaster Jennifer Cho, was appointed in August 2017.

Also in 2017, the California Symphony released a public statement of its commitment to diversity. The orchestra achieved greater than 20% programming by women and people of color in 2019.

Executive Director Aubrey Bergauer left the California Symphony on August 15, 2019. Bergauer stated, "Now is the right time to hand off the California Symphony in a position of strength.” Symphony Board President Bill Armstrong stated, "We are grateful for the extraordinary growth we’ve experienced under her leadership."

Young American Composer-in-Residence 
California Symphony's Young American Composer-in-Residence program has been called "a model for residency programs across the country." The program began in 1991 and each composer is with the Symphony for three years. The first composer to participate in the Young American Composer-in-Residence program was Kamran Ince. "The idea for the program came out of [Barry] Jekowsky's long-standing advocacy of both young musicians and American composers." The program allows young American composers, selected through an application process, to workshop their music with the full orchestra. The ensemble then performs the world premiere of the new pieces composed, and on occasion the symphony has commissioned works from previous participants after their terms have ended.

The first woman composer in the program's history, Katherine Balch, was selected for the 2017–2020 term. She commented that "smaller organizations like the California Symphony often lead the way."

Past Young American Composers-in-Residence 

 Dan Visconti – 2014–2017
 D.J. Sparr – 2011–2014
 Mason Bates – 2007–2010
 Kevin Beavers – 2002–2005
 Pierre Jalbert – 1999–2002
 Kevin Puts – 1996–1999
 Christopher Theofanidis – 1994–1996
 Kamran Ince – 1991–1992

"Orchestra X" 
The "Orchestra X" project garnered attention in the arts administration and non-profit business fields. The call for participants went out in August 2016, asking for volunteers to attend two California Symphony concerts and then attend a discussion about the experience in October, over pizza and beers.

Executive Director Aubrey Bergauer detailed the process and the findings on her blog. Results were posted in November 2016, including main takeaways and what California Symphony staff have done to address the concerns that were brought to light. Some of the main findings of the project included the fact that "the music is not the problem." Instead, items listed as specifically needing help were the organization's website, the seat selection process, and questions such as "What do I wear?" and "When do I clap?"

Two years after the project ran, "Orchestra X: Chapter 2" was published on Bergauer's blog, listing the changes the California Symphony staff had made since the program's results were released.

Sound Minds 
"Inspired by the El Sistema program of Venezuela, California Symphony began Sound Minds as a pilot program at Downer Elementary in San Pablo in 2012. Now serving all second through sixth grade students at Downer Elementary who wish to participate, the program remains completely free of charge to students and families."

Sound Minds provides music instruction to elementary school pupils in addition to other academic work, three days a week. Downer Elementary is in a low-income neighborhood. NPR states that "the school serves mainly struggling Latino families, many of them immigrants from Mexico. More than 95 percent of its students receive free and reduced-price lunch." Downer's previous principal, Marco Gonzales, is especially encouraging of the program. He states that it "gives kids a place to belong" and is "one of the most exciting things I've ever done in a school setting."

The symphony tracks Sound Minds students throughout their experience in the program. Even just one year in the program shows increase in a student's academic scores. In 2017, the California Symphony secured a collaboration with the East Bay Center for Performing Arts, allowing Sound Minds graduates to pursue the competitive Young Artist Diploma Program.

Other information 
Reader's Digest magazine chose the California Symphony as the Best Symphony Orchestra in America in its May 2005 issue, citing the group's Young American Composer-in-Residence Program as well as its focus on young musicians and American composers.

In 2018 and 2019, the Symphony ran a summer adult education program called Fresh Look: The Symphony Exposed. The program runs for four weeks and is led by instructor Scott Foglesong. The slides from the 2018 program may be found here.

References

External links
California Symphony official site
Aubrey Bergauer's Blog
Donato Cabrera's Website

Musical groups established in 1986
Organizations based in Contra Costa County, California
Walnut Creek, California
Musical groups from the San Francisco Bay Area
1986 establishments in California
Orchestras based in California